Protests began in cities throughout Haiti on 7 July 2018 in response to increased fuel prices. Over time, these protests evolved into demands for the resignation of Jovenel Moïse, the then-president of Haiti. Led by opposition politician Jean-Charles Moïse (no relation), protesters stated that their goal to create a transitional government, provide social programs, and prosecute allegedly corrupt officials. Throughout 2019, 2020, and 2021, hundreds of thousands took part in protests calling for the government to resign. On 7 February 2021, supporters of the opposition against the then-incumbent Jovenel Moïse allegedly attempted a coup d'état, leading to 23 arrests, as well as clashes between protestors and police.

On 7 July 2021, Jovenel Moïse was assassinated, allegedly by a group of 28 foreign mercenaries; three of the suspected assassins were killed and 20 arrested, while a manhunt for the other gunmen, as well as for the masterminds of the attack, remains ongoing. On 20 July, Ariel Henry assumed the office of acting prime minister.

In September 2022, further protests erupted in response to rising energy prices, and a federation of gangs created a blockade around Haiti's largest fuel depot. Combined with an outbreak of cholera and widespread acute hunger, the ongoing crisis has led to the United Nations Security Council unanimously voting to impose sanctions on the country.

Background and origins 
A Senate probe released in November 2017 concerning the period 2008–2016 (the René Préval and Michel Martelly administrations as well as the chief of staff of then-sitting President Jovenel Moïse) revealed significant corruption had been funded with Venezuelan loans through the Petrocaribe program.

A new round of protests broke out in February 2021 amid a dispute over Moïse's presidential term. The protesters claimed that Moïse's term officially ended on 7 February 2021 and demanded that he step down. Moïse said that Haitian presidents have five years to serve according to the constitution and he has one more year to serve since he became president in February 2017. Protesters also expressed concerns about the 2021 Haitian constitutional referendum, a referendum proposed by Moïse which would reportedly scrap the ban on consecutive presidential terms and enable Moïse to run again.

Monique Clesca of the Americas Quarterly described it as "a three-year protest movement led by young people that has its roots in 2018 riots over high fuel prices and a lack of jobs and health care. They have made state corruption and President Jovenel Moïse the target of escalating protests."

History

2018 protests 
When Venezuela stopped shipping oil to Haiti in March 2018, this led to fuel shortages. With the removal of government subsidies in July, kerosene prices went up over 50 percent, with similarly steep hikes on other fossil fuels. These rises in taxes on gasoline, diesel, and kerosene that went into effect on 7 July 2018 brought Haitians into the streets. Flights were canceled into and out of Haiti by U.S. airlines. The government backed down on the tax increases, and the President accepted the resignation of the inexperienced Jack Guy Lafontant as Prime Minister on 14 July 2018, replaced one month later by Jean-Henry Céant.

In mid-August 2018, Gilbert Mirambeau Jr. tweeted a photo of himself blindfolded holding a cardboard sign with "Kot kòb PetwoKaribe a ?" ("Where did the PetroCaribe money go?") written on it. The hashtag petrocaribechallenge was soon widely circulated on social media.

Anger over the revelations and accusations from the continuing investigation simmered through social media into the autumn and boiled over again, first in October 2018, with tense scenes and violence in Les Cayes, in Jacmel, and in Saint-Marc. A week of protests in November 2018 led to 10 deaths, including several killed when a government car "lost a wheel and plowed into a crowd."

2019 protests

February 
Significant protests broke out again in February 2019 following a report from the court investigating the Petrocaribe Senate probe. Economic problems and the increased cost of living helped fuel the protests.

On 7 February, protesters targeted and damaged wealthy Haitians' luxury vehicles. The following day, the mayors of Petion-ville and Port-au-Prince announced the cancellation of pre-Haitian Carnival events. Two days later protestors clashed with police, with demonstrators throwing stones at the home of President Moïse, after one of his allies' security personnel struck a woman's car and began to beat her. On 12 February, protesters burned down a popular market, looted stores and assisted with a prison break in Aquin that freed all of the facility's prisoners. In Port-au-Prince, the building housing the Italian and Peruvian consulates was looted by protesters.

President Moïse addressed the country on 14 February, saying he would not step down and "give the country up to armed gangs and drug traffickers." During a funeral procession on 22 February, Haitian police fired tear gas at a crowd of about 200 people carrying the casket of a man killed during protests days earlier. Opposition leader Schiller Louidor called for future protests, though the overall size of protests began to subside that day.

March 
Three days after the lower house voted a censure motion against Prime Minister Jean-Henry Céant's government on 18 March 2019, President Moïse replaced Céant with Jean-Michel Lapin. As of mid-November 2019, this change had not been ratified by the Haitian Parliament. Lacking a government because of the impasse between the President and the Parliament, Haiti has had hundreds of millions in international aid—for which having a sitting government was a prerequisite—suspended.

June 
During escalating protests on 10 June, journalist Rospide Petion was shot in a company car on his way home from Radio Sans Fin in Port-au-Prince, where he had criticized the government on air before leaving the station.

October 
On 4 October, thousands protested across Haiti. In Port-au-Prince, the mayor joined the protestors in calling for President Moïse to step down. Two days earlier, the opposition sent a letter by delegation to the UN Secretary General denouncing the sitting President's role in the Petrocaribe affair, and the government's role in a massacre in La Saline. Lyonel Trouillot wrote in L'Humanité that "[w]ithout dipping into conspiracy theory, there is something worrying about the international community's silence about the Haitian situation."

On 11 October, Néhémie Joseph, a second radio journalist critical of the government, was found dead in the trunk of his car in Mirebalais. On 22 October, thousands of Catholics demonstrated in the capital. Archbishop Max Leroy Mésidor asked Haitian leaders to heed the people who "cannot go on any longer. We are fed up." Energy crises, road blockages, and widespread unrest have led to massive drops in tourism, causing the closure of hotels in Petion-ville, where the Best Western Premier closed permanently, and in Cap-Haïtien, where Mont Joli was closed. Two people were killed in protests in Port-au-Prince on 27 October. Masked police officers were themselves out on the streets demonstrating that day because of low salaries and lack of health insurance.

Although the Haitian constitution calls for legislative elections in October, none were held in October 2019. The United Nations announced they had counted 42 deaths and 86 injuries since mid-September.

November 

Peyi lok ("country lockdown") is how the situation was described in Haitian Creole in November 2019 after two and a half months with schools, courts, businesses, public services, and economic production largely shut down.

December 
Although parents and school directors still felt uneasy amidst barricades and gunfire, schools across the country began to reopen in December.

The U.S. Under Secretary of State for Political Affairs (David Hale) visited Haiti on 6 December, following up on U.S. Ambassador to the UN Kelly Craft's November visit. During his visit, he met with the administration and with leaders from several opposing political parties, some of whom, including Fanmi Lavalas and Fusion-Mache Kontre, refused any collaboration with President Moïse. On 10 December, the U.S. House Foreign Affairs Committee began hearings on the situation in Haiti, which Frederica Wilson had pushed for. At the hearing, Maxine Waters was sharply critical of U.S. support for President Moïse. Neither the State Department nor USAID was present at the hearings.

2020 protests 
In September and October 2020, more protests occurred throughout the country. The protesters criticized the government's response to the COVID-19 pandemic in Haiti, alleging it did not provide enough to those who lost their jobs because of the virus.

Police held protests demanding better pay and working conditions. The police exchanged fire with Haitian soldiers outside the National Palace where police were protesting working conditions in February. In early 2020, a United Nations report said the Haitian police was corrupt, and failing to protect the population.

2021 protests

January
On 14 January, hundreds demonstrated in Port-au-Prince, Cap-Haïtien, Jacmel, Saint-Marc, and Gonaïves against President Moïse. Most of the demonstrations were peaceful, but some violence was reported. On 20 January, hundreds again demonstrated in Port-au-Prince and Cap-Haitien to protest against President Moïse. One woman was shot by Rubber bullets, and several others were wounded during protests. On 28 January, journalists, lawmakers, police officers, retirees, former police officers, and human rights judges led protests against human rights abuses and police brutality, violence, and repression against protesters and chanted "When they don’t get paid, we're the ones they call!"

February
On 7 February 2021, supporters of the opposition against incumbent President Moïse allegedly attempted a coup d'état. Moïse ordered the arrest of 23 people. Hundreds of people marched through the streets of Port-au-Prince on 9 February, chanting "Down with kidnapping! Down with dictatorship!" They bolstered opposition demands for President Moïse to resign. The police fired tear gas and shot in the air in an attempt to disperse protesters, who pelted the security officials with rocks. On 8–9 February, clashes with protesters and security forces occurred in Port-au-Prince, in which protesters threw stones and chanted "Out with dictators" while the riot police fired tear gas at the demonstrators who were protesting killings, disputed term limits.

Protesters calling for President Moïse to step down clashed with police in the capital, Port-au-Prince, on 7 February. The police fired tear gas to disperse the demonstrators. According to the opposition, Moïse's term as president was supposed to end on 7 February 2021, but Moïse stated that his term doesn't end until 2022. On 10 February, the police used tear gas and shot into the air to disperse a rock-throwing crowd of protesters. Twenty-three people were arrested and two journalists were injured during the incident. Protesters shouted "We are back to dictatorship! Down with Moïse! Down with Sison", a reference to the U.S. Ambassador Michele J. Sison, who supports Moïse. On 15 February, tens of thousands of protesters rallied again in Port-au-Prince, accusing the government of trying to establish a new dictatorship and denouncing international support for President Moïse and waves the national flag. Chants like "Down with the dictatorship" were chanted during mass protests.

On 21 February, the opposition movement launched large protests in Jacmel and Port-au-Prince against President Moïse, and fought with the security forces. It is the third general strike, after the nationwide strike on 2 February and 8 February. On 25 February, at least 25 were dead and many injured during a prison break at Croix-des-Bouquets Civil Prison, during which gang leader Arnel Joseph escaped. Joseph was later found and killed in L'Estère. On 28 February, protesters took to the streets targeting offices and throwing stones at the police, despite a bloody crackdown on the widespread street opposition demonstrations. "We are back to dictatorship! Down with Moïse!" was chanted during protests on 28 February.

March
Thousands of Haitians filled the streets of the capital, Port-au-Prince, the manifestations, demonstrations and remonstrances were peaceful, doctors and handicapped lawyers participated in the protest on 7 and 9 March, under the slogan #FreeOurCountry. The protesters called for President Moïse, Prime Minister Joseph Jouthe to resign and called for a crackdown on kidnappers. The hastag FreeHaiti led opposition demonstrations across Haiti on 15 March, to protest the killing of four police officers in a village in Port-au-Prince, calling for the government to resign and demanded a crackdown on gang-led violence on innocent civilians. Citizens also voiced their opposition to corruption and armed gangs controlling cities. On 17 March, thousands wave tree branches and flags in protests against kidnapping and President Moïse. Tens of thousands of protesters and police officers protested across the capital and held a Haitian flag in protest at corruption and police arrests. Trainee police officers joined in the jail break while citizens took to the street for a fifth day to block roads with vehicles, debris and burning tires, also vandalizing a car dealership.

In the capital, thousands of people, some of whom carried the national flag, also chanted slogans against the UN representative in Haiti, whom they accused of downplaying the scale of the demonstrations. The pro-democracy protest on 1 March was non-violent and was attended by tens of thousands of protesters. Thousands of Haitians rallied in multiple cities and the capital Port-au-Prince protesters demanded respect for the current constitution and yelled "Down with dictatorship" as militants burned tires and tore down recently mounted billboards promoting the upcoming constitutional referendum scheduled for 27 June ahead of legislative, local and presidential elections scheduled for the fall.

April
On 3 April, thousands of women protesters marched on the 35th anniversary of the 1986 Haitian women's protests, defying a spike in kidnappings and called on President Moïse to deplore investigations into violence against women in Port-au-Prince. Workers of private businesses endorsed a nationwide work stoppage that occurred on 15 April to protest Haiti's security crisis. In April, protesters targeted areas surrounding government buildings, with eggs, colours, Easter Chick messages and Voodoo symbols to persuade President Moïse to resign ahead of elections. On 22 April, white symbols were drawn during chalk street protests, a battle tactic to call on President Moïse to step down in Jericho and Port-au-Prince. On 7 April, protesters circled the national palace seven times, met with police firing tear gas; the same happened on 22 April, when nuns clashed with police.

July: Assassination of Moïse
On 7 July 2021, Moïse was assassinated, allegedly by a group of 28 foreign mercenaries. Later that day, USGPN (L'Unité de Sécurité Générale du Palais National, or The General Security Unit of the National Palace) killed three of the suspected assassins and arrested 20 others. A manhunt remains ongoing for other gunmen as well as the masterminds of the attack. On 20 July, Ariel Henry assumed the office of prime minister.

2022 crisis 

In September 2022, protests sparked by rising energy prices and the rising cost of living erupted. They continued even after the lifting of the blockade of the Varreux fuel terminal.

2023

On 26 January protesting police officers attacked the official residence of the Prime Minister Ariel Henry and the Toussaint Louverture International Airport, after killing of multiple police officers by armed gangs in recent days. Henry was however able to escape from the airport.

Actions

Moïse government 
President Moïse called for his opposition to participate in peaceful dialogue, saying that "the country's problems aren't solely political. The country’s problems are social, economic and political." The national police stated that there are "malicious individuals" who had interrupted peaceful protests in the country.

Opposition 
The opposition has been led by Jean-Charles Moïse. This opposition declined offers for dialogue, demanded Moïse's resignation, and organized a nationwide general strike to attempt to force him to resign from office. Alongside opposition lawmakers, he called for a transitional government to replace Moïse: "If Jovenel Moïse does not want to step down from power, we are going to name an interim president in the coming days."

Arrest of foreign mercenaries 
The Port-au-Prince newspaper Le Nouvelliste reported on 18 February 2019 that a Haitian citizen and seven non-Haitians were arrested in the city. At the time of their arrest, they were carrying rifles, pistols, drones, and satellite phones in their vehicle, which did not have any license plates. Haitian Foreign Minister Bocchit Edmond confirmed that among them were five Americans. According to the editor of Haiti Liberté, the group included two former Navy SEALs, a former Blackwater employee, and two Serbian mercenaries living in the US. They were tasked with protecting the former head of the National Lottery, who intended to transfer US$80 million from a PetroCaribe bank account—controlled jointly by the President, the Prime Minister, and the President of the Central Bank—to a bank account solely controlled by President Jovenel Moïse.

Violence towards the press 
According to the Committee to Protect Journalists, some reporters have been targeted by protesters. Reuters journalist Robenson Sanon was wounded during the protests in February 2019 but believes that it was coincidental because he was caught in-between clashes.

Journalist Rospide Petion was killed on his way home from the Radio Sans Fin in Port-au-Prince on 10 June 2019 by an unknown gunman. Some correspondents filming protests on 9–10 June were targeted by both police and the crowds. On 11 October, Néhémie Joseph, another radio journalist critical of the government, was found dead in Mirebalais after complaining about receiving death threats. Freelance journalist Vladjimir Legagneur is presumed to have been killed in March 2018 while reporting on gang activity in Grande Ravine.

Response

Governments 
 : U.S. Department of State spokesperson for Western Hemisphere Affairs stated: "We support the right of all people to demand a democratic and transparent government and to hold their government leaders accountable but there is no excuse for violence. Violence leads to instability, less investment, and fewer jobs." The United States prepared humanitarian assistance to ensure food security in Haiti, and called for those responsible for corruption to be held accountable.

Intergovernmental organizations 
 : CARICOM stated that it "is deeply concerned about the continuing violent protests in Haiti, which have resulted in the loss of life, property, destruction of infrastructure and caused grave distress" and "calls for calm and a cessation of the violence, appealing to all involved to engage in constructive dialogue and to respect the constitution, the rule of law and democratic processes so that issues can be resolved in a peaceful atmosphere and allow for the return to a state of normalcy."
 : Secretary General Luis Almagro stated: "We call upon all actors to fully participate in the dialogue process, to respect the democratic process, and to resort to peaceful ways to solve conflicts."
 : United Nations Mission for Justice Support in Haiti said that it "deplores the loss of life and property damage caused by the unacceptable acts of violence that took place on the margins of the rallies, while acknowledging the professionalism demonstrated by the Haitian National Police as a whole" and called "on the Haitian society actors, and primarily the country's leaders, to engage in a constructive and inclusive dialogue in order to identify and implement realistic and lasting solutions to the political and economic crisis currently occurring in Haiti."

See also 
 Anti-Duvalier protest movement

References 

 
2018 in Haiti
Haiti
2019 in Haiti
Haiti
2020 in Haiti
Haiti
2021 in Haiti
Haiti
2022 in Haiti
Haiti
2023 in Haiti
Haiti
February 2019 events in North America
Protest marches
Protests in Haiti
2021 labor disputes and strikes
Fuel protests